Floud is a surname, and may refer to:

 Francis Floud (1875–1965), High Commissioner to Canada
 Peter Floud (1911–1960), civil servant, husband of Jean Floud
 Jean Floud (née MacDonald) (1915–2013), sociologist and principal of Newnham College
 Bernard Floud (1915–1967), television executive and MP
 Roderick Floud (born 1942), economic historian